Gilbert is an unincorporated community in Muskingum County, in the U.S. state of Ohio.

History
An old variant name was Gilbert Station. Gilbert Station had its start as a railroad town, and was named after Gilbert Beatty. A post office called Gilbert was established in 1873, and remained in operation until 1934.

References

Unincorporated communities in Muskingum County, Ohio
1873 establishments in Ohio
Populated places established in 1873
Unincorporated communities in Ohio